The Democratic National Union Movement (DNUM) was a Cambodian political party founded after senior Khmer Rouge official Ieng Sary's defection from the Cambodian National Unity Party in August 1996. A magazine entitled Phka Rik (Flower in Bloom) is associated with it. It was created primarily to facilitate Ieng Sary's reentry into civilian political life, claiming neutrality and that he had broken away from the Khmer Rouge and from the "fascism and cruelty of Pol Pot's regime," naming Nuon Chea, Ta Mok, Son Sen and Yun Yat as Pol Pot's cohorts and "mass murderers of Cambodia." He stated that he was a supporter of "limited democracy," and named Thailand, Singapore and Japan as examples.

Despite building up ties with the Cambodian People's Party (CPP), founded by Hun Sen, the DNUM declined to participate in the 1998 elections. The Movement's support for the CPP-dominated government at the time allowed it considerable autonomy over Pailin, an ex-Khmer Rouge stronghold notable for gem and timber exports.

References

See also
 Provisional Government of National Union and National Salvation of Cambodia
 Khmer National Solidarity Party

1996 establishments in Cambodia
Khmer Rouge
Political parties established in 1996
Political parties in Cambodia
Socialist parties in Cambodia